The Hillsboro High School, in Hillsboro, New Mexico, is a historic Mission/Spanish Revival-style school building that was built in 1922.  It was designed by El Pasobased architects Trost and Trost.

Located on the southeast corner of Elenora St. and First Ave., it has also been known as Sierra County High School and it has been designated SR 1304.  It was listed on the National Register of Historic Places in 1993.

The building is now home to Hillsboro Community Center.

It was the first dedicated four-year high school building in Sierra County and the first secondary school open to all county students.  According to a 1994 report on historic resources in the county: "Most students were from Hillsboro but a few came from Kingston, Lake Valley and other Sierra County communities. Students from nearby ranches traveled to school on horseback. Some families rented or purchased homes in Hillsboro so that their children could attend high school. Other students boarded in town and by 1924 a "bachelor hall" was furnished for the convenience of self-supporting students."

See also

National Register of Historic Places listings in Sierra County, New Mexico

References

External links
 Hillsboro, New Mexico

School buildings on the National Register of Historic Places in New Mexico
Mission Revival architecture in New Mexico
School buildings completed in 1922
Buildings and structures in Sierra County, New Mexico
Schools in New Mexico
National Register of Historic Places in Sierra County, New Mexico
1922 establishments in New Mexico